The Esplanade is a mixed-use development under construction on Randall Road next to the lifestyle center Algonquin Commons in Algonquin, Illinois. It is part of the Algonquin Corporate Campus. It is being built by commercial developers Centerville Properties. Currently, plans are for several restaurants located in the center and peripheral edges of the property, primarily along Randall Road and Corporate Parkway. Currently, 220 apartment units and 40,000 square feet of commercial space is being constructed.  Focal features include an arch over the main entrance, a namesake Esplanade was to  connect the apartments and offices to the shops and restaurants in the front of the property, outdoor terraces in the office buildings, a community center near the apartments, and outdoor patio seating at the anchor restaurants, flanked by graceful ponds, fountains, and landscaping.{
  "type": "FeatureCollection",
  "features": [
    {
      "type": "Feature",
      "properties": {},
      "geometry": {
        "type": "Point",
        "coordinates": [
          -88.340163,
          42.145174
        ]
      }
    },
    {
      "type": "Feature",
      "properties": {},
      "geometry": {
        "type": "Polygon",
        "coordinates": [
          [
            [
              -88.3357,
              42.146868
            ],
            [
              -88.339401,
              42.14684
            ],
            [
              -88.340614,
              42.14746
            ],
            [
              -88.341429,
              42.148113
            ],
            [
              -88.342395,
              42.148335
            ],
            [
              -88.342942,
              42.148335
            ],
            [
              -88.34291,
              42.146335
            ],
            [
              -88.345525,
              42.146315
            ],
            [
              -88.345517,
              42.143511
            ],
            [
              -88.335711,
              42.143606
            ],
            [
              -88.3357,
              42.146868
            ]
          ]
        ]
      }
    }
  ]
}

Stores
Sylvan Learning Center
Fit RX
Inner Peace Pilates
Advanced Skin Concepts
Hobby Lobby

Offices
Centerville Properties
Realty Executives Cornerstone
TechnicalPeople.com
Windy City Strategy

External links
 The Esplanade of Algonquin

References

Algonquin, Illinois
Buildings and structures under construction in the United States